Tridrepana microcrocea is a moth in the family Drepanidae. It was described by Max Gaede in 1914. It is found on Peninsular Malaysia, Sumatra and Borneo.

References

Moths described in 1914
Drepaninae